A referendum on becoming a republic was held in Tuvalu in February 1986. However, the proposed change was approved on only one of the eight islands, resulting in the country remaining a constitutional monarchy.

Results

References

1986 referendums
1986 in Tuvalu
Referendums in Tuvalu
Republicanism in Tuvalu
Constitutional referendums
Monarchy referendums